Nishantha  may refer to

Nishantha Fernando, Sri Lankan cricketer.
Nishantha Fernando (carrom player), Sri Lankan world champion Carrom player 
Nishantha Ranatunga, Sri Lankan cricketer.
Nishantha Muthuhettigamage, Sri Lankan politician.

Sinhalese masculine given names